Clonbinane is a sparse pastoral community in the Australian state of Victoria. Geographically, it lies east of the Hume Freeway but now lacks a distinctive township precinct. According to Crown Land records of 1856, the pastoral region was part of the Western Port District.

The name Clonbinane suggests a marriage of two surnames, Clon and Binane. The Binane part may have found its origins in Welsh, Irish or Scottish clans surnames, deriving from the Latin "Benedictus". It is suggested that the Binane part of the name came from the galectisation of Benedictus and that the Clon part may have its origins in early Scottish history. It is not clear how the name came about as a mention in the Crown Land Leases of 1848.

History

Colonial history
During the development of the Australian colonies, the Clonbinane area was part of the Colony of New South Wales between 1788 and 1851 when, on 1 July 1851, Victoria was separated from New South Wales. An early mention of the name Clonbinane appeared in The Argus on 29 September 1848 in relation to Claims to Leases of Crown Land. At that time, a –run Clonbinane was cited as a claim by Michael Heffernan.

Gold mining
Gold mining commenced in the Clonbinane area around 1870 and lasted until around 1880. There was a cyanide processing plant on the Wandong-Kilmore Rd which served the local gold mines. When the gold appeared to run out, the area was extensively logged and supported saw milling. More recently, test drillings have indicated  potential yield on the Golden Dyke, Rising Sun and Apollo prospects at Beadell Resources Reedy Creek Project.

Postal services
Clonbinane Post Office opened on 23 January 1892 and closed on 1 July 1895, reopening again 5 October 1897 and closing 30 April 1956. According to National Archives of Australia, it was determined in 1964 that, at the time of its existence in 1902, the Clonbinane Post Office was domiciled at the Clonbinane Park homestead. The prominence of that site suggests that was the true location of Clonbinane, which concurs with government mapping. According to the Victorian Postal Guide of March 1895, mail coming from Melbourne had to be posted by 0530 hours to reach Clonbinane Post Office by 1330 hours on the same day, allowing for sorting and logistics. At Clonbinane, mail had to lodged by 0900 hours to reach Melbourne's GPO by 1525 hours. Those time-frames suggest that mail was routinely carried by train during the period, probably between Melbourne and Wandong. The Clonbinane post office building burnt down in the Black Saturday fires on 7 February 2009. It was a single room weatherboard shed with a corrugated iron roof and was on the property known as Walhaven on Government Road which, along with the original Clonbinane Park homestead, was destroyed in the fires.

Location
The small village called Clonbinane (next to and named after the homestead) is located on the banks of Sunday Creek, just off Clonbinane Road, and is accessed via Hibberds Lane over a bridge across the creek. In its gold mining heyday, the village had about 20 houses and a school. Clonbinane shares a postcode with neighbouring towns Broadford, Flowerdale, Hazeldene, Reedy Creek, Strath Creek, Sugarloaf Creek, Sunday Creek, Tyaak and Waterford Park. An adjacent housing estate called Waterford Park is often mistaken for Clonbinane itself. In 2006, the total population of this postcode was 5047.

2000s
In July 2007, a Rockwell Commander 500S aircraft, en route to Shepparton from Essendon Airport, broke up in-flight approximately 1.5 km SSW of the Equine Centre (at ), crashing in a heavily timbered mountain range. The aircraft was carrying the aircraft's owner and a pilot on an aircraft recovery mission when it encountered severe turbulence; both sustained fatal injuries.

The region was affected by the Black Saturday bushfires on 7 February 2009 with the fires converging from Kilmore East over the area's farmlets.

Places of interest
The area is host to the Equi Ventures Equestrian Centre, located at  just before the entrance to the Anderson's Gardens bush park on the Clonbinane Road at the entrance to the Mt Disappointment National Park. As of 1 August 2011, the bush parks are still inaccessible or difficult to access due to forest safety concerns after the fires.

Clonbinane Park
According to The Argus of 27 January 1866 John McRae McKenzie was reported as being of Clonbinane and Tallarook Stations when on 25 January 1866 he married Emily Anne Cairnes, eldest daughter of Henry Cairnes of Dublin, Ireland. John McDonald was reported in the records to have been assessed for 4,600 sheep, 20 cattle and 8 horses. "Clonbinane Station" appears to have been a much larger property with a sales notice in The Argus of 4 July 1878 citing . The old homestead at Clonbinane Park was almost completely destroyed by the Black Saturday bushfires in 2009. The shell of the building and its tower were finally demolished in May 2021.

Weather
Rainfall typically results in balanced wet and dry days per annum. Highest rainfall rates occur in February and late October through November.

Temperatures typically peak in February and are at their lowest in June–July which can result in morning frost. The daily spread is about  degrees. On Black Saturday, temperatures in and around Melbourne reached near .

References

External links

Towns in Victoria (Australia)
Shire of Mitchell
Hume Highway